Michel Platini Ferreira Mesquita or simply Michel Platini (born 8 September 1983 in Ceilândia) is a Brazilian footballer who currently plays as a forward.

Career
Platini played for Brazlândia, Mexican Primera División side Pachuca, Gama, Araguaína, Grêmio Anápolis, Hong Kong First Division League side South China and Veranópolis, before moving to Chernomorets Burgas in Bulgaria.

Chernomorets Burgas
Platini signed a three-year contract with Chernomorets on 29 June 2008, after a successful trial period with the club. He marked his competitive debut on 5 July with the equalising goal in Chernomorets's second round match of Intertoto Cup against ND Gorica which ended in a 1–1 draw. Platini made his Bulgarian A Group debut against Botev Plovdiv in a 1–0 away win on 10 August. He scored his first league goal for Chernomorets on 21 September 2008 against Litex Lovech in a 2–2 away draw. During his first season, he scored 10 goals in 27 league games.

In May 2009 it was reported in the Bulgaria media that Michel was a target for Russian side Amkar Perm and Levski Sofia. Platini began the following season for Chernomorets, netting three goals in four league games.

CSKA Sofia
On 31 August 2009, CSKA Sofia signed Platini for a three-year deal keeping him in the club until 30 June 2012. He was given the number 22 shirt. Platini scored his first official goal for CSKA in the first match of the group stage of the UEFA Europa League against Fulham F.C. on 17 September 2009, which ended in a 1–1 draw.

On 26 February 2011, Platini scored two goals in the Eternal Derby against Levski Sofia, which ended in a 3–1 away win for CSKA. On 25 May, Platini won the Bulgarian Cup with CSKA.

On 17 October 2011, Platini signed a new contract with the club until the end of 2013–14 season.

Dinamo București
On 13 February 2012, Platini joined Dinamo București Ironically, he had played against them as a CSKA player in an ill-tempered friendly match just a week before, being sent off. However, he made only 8 appearances, struggling to establish himself in the squad.

Return to CSKA
On 12 July 2012, he returned to CSKA as part of the deal for Boris Galchev. He finished the season with 16 appearances, scoring 8 goals.

Ludogorets Razgrad
On 28 July 2013, CSKA shockingly announced that they have reached an agreement with title rivals and Bulgarian champions Ludogorets Razgrad for the transfer of Platini. On 30 June 2013, he was officially presented as a new signing in front of the media at the club's training camp in Austria. After some time in Ludogorets, Platini was usually a sub and later on, he was released by the club.

Slavia Sofia

After being released from Ludogorets Razgrad, Platini signed a contract with Slavia Sofia and made 8 appearances, scoring 3 goals.
Later on in the winter pause he was released by Slavia Sofia and subsequently returned to Brazil. As of March 2015, Platini is the second highest foreign goalscorer in the A PFG of all time, having netted on 45 occasions.

Career statistics

Honours

CSKA Sofia
 Bulgarian Cup: 2011
 Bulgarian Supercup: 2011

Ludogorets
 Bulgarian A Group: 2013–14
 Bulgarian Cup: 2013–14

References

External links
  Profile at cska.bg
 Profile at Sambafoot

1983 births
Living people
Brazilian footballers
Association football forwards
Sociedade Esportiva do Gama players
Grêmio Esportivo Anápolis players
Clube do Remo players
Ceilândia Esporte Clube players
South China AA players
PFC Chernomorets Burgas players
PFC CSKA Sofia players
FC Dinamo București players
PFC Ludogorets Razgrad players
PFC Slavia Sofia players
Brasiliense Futebol Clube players
Hong Kong First Division League players
First Professional Football League (Bulgaria) players
Liga I players
Brazilian expatriate footballers
Brazilian expatriate sportspeople in Hong Kong
Brazilian expatriate sportspeople in Bulgaria
Brazilian expatriate sportspeople in Romania
Expatriate footballers in Hong Kong
Expatriate footballers in Bulgaria
Expatriate footballers in Romania
Araguaína Futebol e Regatas players
Sportspeople from Federal District (Brazil)